Agnes Marshall Cowan MRCOG (1880–1940) was a Scottish physician who was one of the first fully qualified female physicians in Britain, and a medical missionary in Manchuria during its plague. She oversaw medical issues in the "Devil's Porridge" explosive factory at Gretna serving the demand for explosives during the First World War.

In 1934 she was the first Scottish female to be granted a professorship, but not until 1940 was a professorship granted within Scotland itself (Margaret Fairlie).

Life

She was born on 19 April 1880 in Edinburgh the daughter of John Cowan and his wife Marion Wallace Dickson. She was the sixth of 11 children and the family lived in a large (then-new) stone villa in the Grange district in the south of the city. She was one of the first female students allowed at Edinburgh University and studied Medicine alongside Jessie Gellatly, Mabel L. Ramsay and others. They all graduated MB ChB in July 1906.

Following graduation in the summer of 1906 she and Jessie Gellatly joined the staff at Leith Hospital in north Edinburgh (the first hospital to accept female physicians).

She parted company with her friend Jessie around 1908 and went to work as a surgeon at the Eye Department of Edinburgh Royal Infirmary. In the summer of 1911 she was motivated to leave Scotland and travelled to China as a medical missionary to address the huge outbreak of pneumonia in the north, known in Britain as the Manchurian plague. She was not alone in this and was part of a large British contingent requested by the Chinese physician Wu Lien-teh to address the disaster.

In 1914 she was working in a hospital at Ashiho near Harbin. In 1915 she moved to a Mukden Medical College to work with fellow Edinburgh physician Dugald Christie. Both of these ventures were financially supported jointly by the Church of Scotland and Edinburgh University. Manchuria at this time was under Imperial Russian influence and the overall environment of both plague and political unrest was far from easy. The area was also troubled by bandits who would raid the towns and hospitals and would sometimes take equipment and medicine. Nevertheless, Agnes stayed for many years before being forced to leave in the aftermath of the Russian Revolution of 1917.

In 1915, during her absence, her father had been knighted and her parents became Sir John Cowan and Lady Marion Cowan.

Possibly through her father's influence, Agnes returned not to a life of leisure, but to a commission as a Medical Officer in the Queen Mary's Army Auxiliary Corps attached to the Royal Army Medical Corps. In this capacity, within weeks of arriving in Britain, she began working at HM Factory, Gretna commonly known as the "Devil's Porridge" factory, where thousands of tons of explosives were created for use on the Western Front. Here she served as assistant to Dr Thomas Goodall Nasmyth. Her duties here included attending victims of the several explosions and attending the side effects of breathing and touching the caustic substances. After the armistice in November 1918 the factory was quickly wound down.

In 1919 she returned her previous position in Mukden Medical College in Manchuria which remained under the Principalship of Dugald Christie. At this point the troubles in Manchuria had calmed a little. In 1934 the college became the first outwith Great Britain to have a medical degree recognised in Scotland (due to its strong link with Edinburgh University). Agnes certainly formed part of this decision: in 1934 she had made a Member of the Royal College of Obstetricians and Gynaecologists and the college granted her a Professorship in Obstetrics and Gynaecology in 1934.

However, from September 1931, things had started to go wrong, due to the Japanese invasion of Manchuria, which included the capture of Harbin in February 1932. Mukden was further inland and of less military significance. However, as the Japanese control spread and with the imminent onset of the Second World War Agnes left Manchuria in the summer 1939, never to return. Her health by this stage was also poor. Both her parents were by then dead and she had lost her Edinburgh connection.

It is thought Agnes lived her final months with mutual friends in Cambridge, and she died there on 22 August 1940 aged 60. Her body was returned to Edinburgh and she was buried with her family in Grange Cemetery in south Edinburgh. The grave lies in the eastmost strip section, facing east, in the south-east portion of the main cemetery.

References
 

1880 births
1940 deaths
Medical doctors from Edinburgh
Alumni of the University of Edinburgh
20th-century Scottish medical doctors
Medical missionaries